Eucalyptus stricklandii, commonly known as Strickland's gum, is a species of small tree that is endemic to Western Australia, but possibly also naturalised in Victoria. It has rough, crumbly to flaky bark near the base of the trunk, smooth reddish brown to grey bark above, lance-shaped adult leaves, flower buds in groups of seven, yellow flowers and bell-shaped fruit.

Description
It has rough, crumbly to flaky bark on the lower part of the trunk, smooth reddish brown to grey bark above. Flowering occurs from November to December or from January to March and the flowers are yellow.

Taxonomy and naming
Eucalyptus stricklandii was first formally described in 1911 by Joseph Maiden in the Journal of the Natural History & Science Society of Western Australia. The specific epithet (stricklandii) honours Gerald Strickland.

Distribution and habitat
Strickland's gum grows on ridges, rocky hills and sometimes near creeks in woodland from near Coolgardie to Norseman in the Coolgardie and Murchison biogeographic regions. It has been cultivated in semi-arid areas of Victoria and may also be naturalised in the north-west of that state.

Conservation status
This eucalypt is classified as "not threatened" by the Western Australian Government Department of Parks and Wildlife.

See also
List of Eucalyptus species

References

Eucalypts of Western Australia
Trees of Australia
stricklandii
Myrtales of Australia
Plants described in 1911
Taxa named by Joseph Maiden